Hendrik Carel Knoppers (9 April 1930 – 19 June 2021) was a Dutch politician. A member of the Christian Historical Union (CHU) and the Christian Democratic Appeal (CDA), he served as Mayor of Abcoude from 1963 to 1974 and Mayor of Ommen from 1974 to 1990.

Biography
Knoppers studied law at Leiden University, where he earned his master's degree in 1957. From 1957 to 1963, he worked in the Provincial Planning Service of North Brabant.

He was Mayor of Abcoude from 1963 to 1974 and Mayor of Ommen from 1974 to 1990. After he retired, he continued to live in his residence in Ommen. He was made an honorary citizen of both cities.

Carel Knoppers died in Ommen on 19 June 2021 at the age of 91.

References

1930 births
2021 deaths
Politicians from Utrecht (city)
Mayors of places in the Netherlands
Christian Historical Union politicians
Christian Democratic Appeal politicians
Leiden University alumni